Maxima of Rome was a slave and friend of Saint Ansanus of Siena. She was martyred by being beaten to death in the persecutions of Diocletian, circa 304. Locally recognized as saint, her feast day is September 2.

Martyrology

References

Italian saints
4th-century Christian saints